L'Argentière may refer to several communes in France:

 L'Argentière-la-Bessée, in the Hautes-Alpes department
 Saint-Genis-l'Argentière, in the Rhône department
 Sainte-Foy-l'Argentière, in the Rhône department
 Villemagne-l'Argentière, in the Hérault department

See also
 Largentière, a commune in the Ardèche department